Portela is a surname of Iberian origin. Notable people with the name include:

 Adrián Portela (born 1986), Argentine handball player
 Ângela Portela (born 1962), Brazilian politician
 Antonio Portela (born 1966), Puerto Rican swimmer
 Carlos García Portela  (1921–2011), Puerto Rican lawyer, politician and senator
 Consuelo Portela Audet (1885–1959), Cuban-born Spanish cuplé singer
 Diogo Portela (born 1988), Brazilian darts player
 Eduardo Portela (born 1934), Spanish basketball player, coach, and executive
 Ena Lucía Portela (born 1972), Cuban novelist, essayist, and writer of short stories
 Francisco Portela (1833–1913), Brazilian physician and politician
 Henrique Portela ( 1920–1929), Portuguese football midfielder
 José M. Portela (born 1949), officer of the United States Air Force
 Juan Portela (born 1984), Spanish football defender
 Lincoln Portela (born 1953), Brazilian politician, television and radio personality, and pastor
 Manuel Portela Valladares 1868–1952), Spanish political figure 
 Maria Portela (born 1988), Brazilian middleweight judoka
 María Carmen Portela (1898-1983), Argentine-born Uruguayan engraver and sculptor 
 Miguel Portela (born 1974), Portuguese rugby union player
 Pablo Sebastián Portela (born 1980), Argentine handball player
 Teresa Portela (disambiguation), multiple people, including:
Teresa Portela (Portuguese canoeist) (born 1987), Portuguese sprint canoeist
Teresa Portela (Spanish canoeist) (born 1982), Spanish sprint canoeist

Portuguese-language surnames
Spanish-language surnames